Samuel French (1821–1898) was an American entrepreneur and publisher.

Samuel French may also refer to:
Samuel French, Inc. (US)
Samuel French Ltd. (UK)

 S. Bassett French (1820–1898), Virginia attorney, judge, Confederate officer and writer
 Samuel Gibbs French (1818–1910), American military officer, Confederate Major General and planter
 Samuel S. French (1841–1913), American soldier who fought for the Union in the American Civil War

French, Samuel